Collins and Maconie's Hit Parade was a radio programme that aired from May 1994 to June 1997. There were 74 hour-long episodes and it was broadcast on BBC Radio 1.  It starred Andrew Collins and Stuart Maconie, with regular comedy input from fellow NME journalist David Quantick. Produced by BBC Radio 1 DJ Mark Goodier's production company Wise Buddah, it was essentially a revival of the defunct round table format, in which the week's new singles are assessed by two regular guest contributors, predominantly music journalists, such as Caitlin Moran, Adrian Deevoy and John Harris of Q magazine.  

The series won a Sony Radio Academy Award in 1995.

References 
 Lavalie, John. Collins and MAconie's Hit Parade. EpGuides. 21 Jul 2005. 29 Jul 2005  <http://epguides.com/CollinsandMaconieHitParade/.

BBC Radio 1 programmes
1994 radio programme debuts